Kajavadar is a village in Sihor, Bhavnagar district, Gujarat, India.

References

Villages in Bhavnagar district